Keith Radcliffe Bell (born 14 June 1948) was an Australian rugby union player who played for the Australian national rugby union team, more commonly known as the Wallabies.

Bell, a prop, was born in Goondiwindi, Queensland and claimed one international rugby cap for Australia. He was educated at the Anglican Church Grammar School.

References

Australian rugby union players
Australia international rugby union players
1948 births
Living people
People educated at Anglican Church Grammar School
Rugby union players from Queensland
Rugby union props